Bombay potato (sometimes called Bombay aloo or aloo (alu) Bombay), is an Indian dish prepared using potatoes that are cubed, parboiled and then fried and seasoned with various spices such as cumin, curry, garlic, garam masala, turmeric, mustard seeds, chili powder salt and pepper. Onion, tomatoes and tomato sauce are sometimes used as ingredients. Bombay potato can also be served as a side dish, rather than as a main course.

See also
 Aloo gobi
 List of potato dishes

References

Potato dishes
 Indian cuisine
Deep fried foods